On the midnight of the second and third of October 2016, militants attacked a camp of the Indian Army's 46 Rashtriya Rifles in the Baramulla district of Jammu and Kashmir, India.

The attack was said to have begun at 10:30 PM local time, with at least one officer of the Indian Border Security Force (BSF) killed and a number injured. Two militants were also reportedly killed. The attack came within weeks after militants attacked an Indian Army installation in Baramulla district's Uri area.

According to India Today, the attackers were Handeef alias Hilal, 23, and Ali, 22, Pakistani nationals belonging to Masood Azhar's Jaish-e-Mohammad (JeM) militant organization .

On 6 October, the Indian army exchanged fire with militants Kupwara district, and 3 militants were killed.

See also
2016 Uri attack

References

October 2016 crimes in Asia
October 2016 events in India
Terrorist incidents in Jammu and Kashmir
Baramulla district
Terrorist incidents in India in 2016
Attacks on military installations in the 2010s
Attacks on buildings and structures in India